Mel Fell is a children's picture book written and illustrated by Corey R. Tabor, published on February 2, 2021, by Balzer + Bray, a HarperCollins imprint. It focuses on Mel, a kingfisher, as she attempts her first flight. The book was received positively, and was the recipient of a Caldecott Honor in 2022.

Reception 
Publishers Weekly gave the book a starred review and praised the technique utilized by Tabor for the illustrations, commenting how they are "alive with wonderful textures and soft colors." Kirkus Reviews noted that the story, about a kingfisher plummeting towards the water below her, has a vertical format that "prompts readers to look longitudinally at each spread," which "inspires both excitement and anxiety." They concluded by saying the book could inspire young readers "to feel brave, to try, and to believe they can soar."

Kate Quealy-Gainer, writing for the Bulletin of the Center for Children's Books, commented on the book's narration, which they considered to be "lively," and the illustrations, which "confer buoyant energy." Julie Danielson, for The Horn Book Magazine, called Mel Fell a "playful and innovatively designed book" and added that having to turn the book to read it makes the story "even more dramatic."

Mel Fell was chosen by the American Library Association as one of its "Notable Children's Books" of 2021 and was also the recipient of a Caldecott Honor.

In 2022, the Weston Woods Studios released the animated film adaptation, narrated by Noah Wall with animation by Galen Fott.

References 

2021 children's books
American picture books
Books about birds
Caldecott Honor-winning works
Balzer + Bray books